Kapurthala State, with its capital at Kapurthala, was a former Princely state in the Punjab region of British India. Ruled by Ahluwalia Sikh rulers, spread across . According to the 1901 census the state had a population of 314,341 and contained two towns and 167 villages. In 1930, Kapurthala became part of the Punjab States Agency and acceded to the Union of India in 1947.

In colonial India, Kapurthala State was known for its communal harmony, with its Sikh ruler Jagatjit Singh building the Moorish Mosque for his Muslim subjects. At the time of the Indian independence movement, the ruler of the Kapurthala State opposed the partition of India and advocated for a united, secular country.

Origins 
The ruling dynasty of Kapurthala originated in the Ahluwalia misl. According to this account, Krishna's descendant Gaj built the fort of Gajni, and lost his life in a battle against a joint Roman-Khorasani army. His son Salibahan established the city of Sialkot, and started the Shak era after defeating the Shaks in 78 CE.

After the Muslim conquest of Punjab, his descendants migrated to the Jaisalmer area, where they came to be known as Bhatti Rajput tribe. After Alauddin Khalji's conquest of Jaisalmer, some of the Bhatti tribe people's migrated to Tarn Taran district, mingled with Jats. Gradually, they came to be known as Jats, and in the 17th century, they joined Guru Hargobind's army. Ganda Singh of this family raided Lahore, whose governor Dilawar Khan persuaded him to join the Lahore army, and assigned him the fief of Ahlu and some other villages. Ganda Singh's son Sadhu (or Sadho) Singh lived in Ahlu, because of which the family came to be known as Ahluwalia. Sadhu Singh and his four sons married into Kalal families, because of which the family came to be known as Ahluwalia. The descendants of Sadhu Singh son Gopal Singh (who was the grandfather of Jassa Singh) established the royal family of Kapurthala. The British administrator Lepel Griffin (1873) dismissed this account as spurious. The Sikh author Gian Singh, in his Twarikh Raj Khalsa (1894), wrote that the Ahluwalia family adopted the Kalal caste identity much before Sadhu Singh.

The Ahluwalia misl rose to prominence under Jassa Singh Ahluwalia, who was the first person to use the name "Ahluwalia". Originally known as Jassa Singh Kalal, he styled himself as Ahluwalia after his ancestral village of Ahlu and belonged to the Kalal community. He is regarded as the founder of the Kapurthala State.

Even after other misls lost their territories to Ranjit Singh's Sikh Empire, the emperor permitted the descendants of Jassa Singh to retain their estates. After the British took over the Sikh territories in 1846, Jassa Singh's descendants became the ruling family of the Kapurthala State.

Religion

Royal dynasty

Sardars
 Jassa Singh (1777 – 20 October 1783) (b. 1718 – d. 1783)
Bagh Singh (20 October 1783 – 10 July 1801) (b. 1747 – d. 1801)

Rajas

 Fateh Singh Ahluwalia (10 July 1801 – 20 October 1837) (b. 1784 – d. 1837)
 Nihal Singh (20 October 1837 – 13 September 1852) (b. 1817 – d. 1852)
 Randhir Singh (13 September 1852 – 12 March 1861) (b. 1831 – d. 1870)

Raja-i Rajgan
 Randhir Singh (12 March 1861 – 2 April 1870) (b. 1831 – d. 1870)
 Kharak Singh (2 April 1870 –  3 September 1877) (b. 1850 – d. 1877)

 Jagatjit Singh (3 September 1877 – 12 December 1911) (b. 1872 – d. 1949)

Maharajas
 Jagatjit Singh (12 December 1911 – 15 August 1947) (b. 1872 – d. 1949)
Paramjit Singh
Brigadier Sukhjit Singh MVC

Crown Princes
 Tikka Raja Shatrujit Singh

Gallery

See also
Anita Delgado
Political integration of India

Notes

References

External links

Kapurthala www.sikh-heritage.co.uk

 
1772 establishments in India
1947 disestablishments in India